Benjamin Hough (1773 – September 4, 1819) was the second State Auditor of the U.S. State of Ohio from 1808 to 1815. He also served in local political offices and in both houses of the Ohio General Assembly.

Hough was born in Virginia. He was in Jefferson County, Northwest Territory by 1802 when he surveyed Cross Creek Township into quarter sections. He was elected a county commissioner at the first election, April 2, 1804, after Ohio became a state.

Hough represented Jefferson County in the Ohio State Senate 1805 to 1807, and the Ohio House of Representatives 1807 to 1808. Thomas Gibson resigned as Ohio State Auditor March 1, 1808. The legislature had adjourned February 22, 1808, and would not meet again until December, so Governor Thomas Kirker appointed Hough as Auditor.

Hough was re-elected by the legislature December 18, 1809, and again February 20, 1812, serving until March 15, 1815. He remained in the capital, Chillicothe, after his term, and was elected again to the Ohio Senate, 1815 to 1816, from Ross County. He was a Democratic-Republican Party Presidential elector in 1816 for Monroe/Tompkins.

Hough was married to Elizabeth Core on August 29, 1806, by Stephen Ford, justice of the Peace, in Jefferson County. Hough died at Chillicothe, leaving his widow and children. He is buried at Grandview Cemetery.

Notes

References

 

1773 births
1819 deaths
American surveyors
County commissioners in Ohio
Burials at Grandview Cemetery (Chillicothe, Ohio)
Members of the Ohio House of Representatives
Ohio Democratic-Republicans
Ohio state senators
People from Jefferson County, Ohio
Politicians from Chillicothe, Ohio
State Auditors of Ohio
1816 United States presidential electors